The Royal Gibraltar Post Office is the postal services in the British overseas territory of Gibraltar. It is currently a department within the Government of Gibraltar.

History

The Gibraltar Post Office has been running for over 150 years, as in 1857 the Overland Post Office (based in the colonial authorities' premises at Secretary's Lane) merged with the Packet Agency (which had office's in Turnbull's Lane). The first stamps went on sale in September and a year later a new building was completed and opened at 104 Main Street. This remains the main post office in Gibraltar today.

In 1886 the local colonial authorities took over control of the Gibraltar Post Office and were able to issue their own stamps. Initially they overprinted Bermuda stamps but by December they had their own design. However, they still sold Spanish stamps if required and between 1889 and 1898 the post office sold Gibraltar stamps valued in pesetas as this was the currency in circulation.

For the first fifty years, the Gibraltar Post Office had responsibility for the post office not only in Gibraltar but also for the British postal service in Morocco. This ended in 1907.

In 2005 the Gibraltar Post Office was granted the title of "Royal" by Her Majesty the Queen. Gibraltar is the only Commonwealth or British Overseas Territory post office outside the United Kingdom that bears this title. Gibraltar has traditional red pillar boxes and the tops are also frequently painted black.

The Post Office continues to provide some traditional services and was still using benefit books after they were abandoned in the United Kingdom, while there is also a special philatelic counter to sell the commemorative stamps.

The Post office provides a next day delivery service to the community with letters posted before 07.00 that day in any of the 30+ pillar boxes located in Gibraltar delivered same day. As the official designated postal operator by the UPU (Universal Postal Union) it has a universal service obligation to deliver mail to every Gibraltar resident and provide an international mail service to all UPU member countries worldwide (192 member countries)

Services
The Royal Gibraltar Post Office provides the following services:
Letter post
Parcel post
Airmail
Express mail services
Poste restante
Post office boxes
Registration services
Postal orders

Banking facilities are provided through the Gibraltar Savings Bank, which is part of the Gibraltar Government services.

Office locations

The Royal Gibraltar Post Office has a number of offices around Gibraltar:
Main Office - A Victorian building which sits in Main Street.
P.O. Boxes Unit - Irish Town
Mail Operations Centre and Parcel Post - Unit E, Admiral Rooke Road

The North District Post Office in Glacis Road and the South District Post Office in Scud Hill were closed in late 2014 for refurbishment, but in February 2016 had still not reopened. In September of that year, the Government stated that there were no plans to reopen either Post Office; Minister Joe Bossano explained there had been a proposal to house Savings Bank outlets in the premises but that when the money generated was considered, it was found not to be financially viable.

See also
 Postage stamps and postal history of Gibraltar
 Postal orders of Gibraltar
 Postal addresses in Gibraltar

References

External links
 

Government agencies established in 1886
Gib
Postal system of Gibraltar
Philately of Gibraltar
Organizations with royal patronage
19th-century establishments in Gibraltar
1886 establishments in Gibraltar
Members of the Small European Postal Administration Cooperation